Sebastian Cabot may refer to: 
Sebastian Cabot (explorer) (1476–1557), Italian explorer
Sebastian Cabot (actor) (1918–1977), British actor